Maid in India is an Indian web series created by Web Talkies. The story revolves around India's most iconic maid, Priyanka Bai, who is witty and progressive.

Plot description 
Priyanka, a progressive maid who enjoys complete social media presence, is tech-savvy as she uses a high-end iPhone. She is the woman of the hour who breaks all the stereotypes. Being far more level-headed and sophisticated than her masters themselves, she shows her mistress how to sweep the thick and thins of life under the rug with her witty solutions.
She is back in the second season of Maid in India, with twice the fun, twice the oomph and twice the craziness. But this time to add to her trouble, enters Tia, Sandhya's sister, who is an air hostess for a leading American Airline. Tia's uber-modern approach towards things annoy Priyanka and the game of one-upmanship begins between the two. The people to get caught in the crossfire are Sahil and Sandhya. We start the second season with Tia entering the house and having an instant disagreement with Priyanka setting in motion an uproariously funny chain of events. And to add to the fun, things get a little odd for Sahil who now has to deal with three women in his life while he has not been able to deal with one. Sandhya's constant bickering, Tia's sensual nature and Priyanka's flirtatious nature add up to more miseries in his life as whatever he does, Sandhya still beats the hell out of him. So expect the second season of Maid In India to be more funny, more raunchy and much more crazy than its dhinchak first season.

Cast 
 Flora Saini as Priyanka Bai
 Sandhya Mehta as Sandhya
 Sahil Gandhi as Sahil
 Sanyukta Timsina as Tia

References 
 Web Talkies rolls out season 2 of web series 'Maid in India' . Television Post. Retrieved 2016-12-26.
 I've become more flirtatious now: Actress Flora Saini. IANS Live. Retrieved 2017-01-05.

External link 
 

Indian web series
Hindi-language web series